Lovely is an English surname. Notable people with the surname include:

 Arvinder Singh Lovely (Deoli MLA) (1965–2021), Indian politician
 Arvinder Singh Lovely (born 1968), Indian politician
 Jackie Lovely, Canadian politician from Alberta
 Joan Lovely, American politician
 John A. Lovely (1843–1908), American jurist
 Karen Lovely (born 1959), American electric blues singer and songwriter
 Louise Lovely (1895–1980, born as Nellie Louise Carbasse), Australian actress
 Pete Lovely (1926–2011), American racecar driver
 Stephen Lovely (born 1966), American writer

English-language surnames